Giuseppe Camuncoli (born March 2, 1975) is an Italian comic book artist best known for his work on the Marvel Comics titles The Amazing Spider-Man and The Superior Spider-Man and the DC Comics/Vertigo series Hellblazer as well as his work illustrating The Storms of Chai, the last installment in the Lone Wolf gamebook series published before the death of author Joe Dever.

Bibliography

DC Comics 

 Swamp Thing (Vol. 3) #12–20 (pencils, with writer Brian K. Vaughan, 2001)

 Hellblazer (Vol. 1) #168, 169, 206, 243, 244, 250–253, 256–258, 261–264, 267–275, 277–279, 281, 283, 285–290, 293–300 (pencils, with writers Brian Azzarello, Mike Carey, Andy Diggle and Peter Milligan, 2002–13)
 Vertigo Pop! Bangkok #1–4 (pencils, with writer Jonathan Vankin, 2003)
 Robin (Vol. 4) #129, 137 (pencils, with writer Bill Willingham, 2004–5)
 Batman (Vol. 1) #643–644 (pencils, with writer Bill Willingham, 2005)
 52 #41, 47 (pencils, with writers Geoff Johns, Grant Morrison, Greg Rucka and Mark Waid, 2007)
 Adventures of Superman #2 (layouts, with writer J.M. DeMatteis, 2013)
 Batman: Europa #1–4 (artist, with writers Matteo Casali and Brian Azzarello, 2015–16)
 All-Star Batman #8 (pencils, with writer Scott Snyder, 2017)
Batman Secret Files #2 (pencils, with writer Mairghread Scott, 2019)
The Other History of the DC Universe #1–5 (pencils, with writer John Ridley, 2020–21)
Joker #11–15 (pencils, with writers Matthew Rosenberg and James Tynion IV, 2022)

Marvel Comics

 Annihilation: Heralds of Galactus #1 (pencils, with writer Christos Gage, 2007)
 The Incredible Huk #603–604 (pencils, with writer Greg Pak, 2009)
 Dark Wolverine #75–77, 81–84 (pencils, with writers Daniel Way and Marjorie Liu, 2009–10)
 Daken: Dark Wolverine #1–6 (pencils, with writers Daniel Way and Marjorie Liu, 2010–11)

The Amazing Spider-Man (Vol. 1) #663–665, 674, 675, 680, 681, 688–691, 695–697, 700 (pencils, with writer Dan Slott, 2011–12)
Fantastic Four #607–608 (pencils, with writer Jonathan Hickman, 2012)
The Superior Spider-Man #4, 5, 11–13, 20, 21, 27–33 (pencils, with writers Dan Slott and Christos Gage, 2013–14)
The Amazing Spider-Man (Vol. 3) #1, 7, 8, 12–15 (pencils, with writers Dan Slott and Christos Gage, 2014–15)
The Amazing Spider-Man (Vol. 4) #1–5, 9–16, 19–25, 800 (pencils, with writers Dan Slott and Christos Gage, 2015–2018)
Star Wars: Darth Vader #1–25 (pencils, with writer Charles Soule, 2017–18)

Image Comics 

 Bone Rest #1–8 (artist, with writer Matteo Casali, 2005–06)
 Green Valley #1–9 (pencils, with writer Max Landis, 2016–17)

 Undiscovered Country #1–ongoing (pencils, with writers Scott Snyder and Charles Soule, 2019–present)

WildStorm 

 Captain Atom: Armageddon #1–9 (pencils, with writer Will Pfeifer, 2005–06)

References

External links

Living people
People from Reggio Emilia
1975 births
Italian cartoonists